Matej Čurma (born 7 March 1996) is a Slovak footballer who plays for Spartak Trnava as a defender.

Club career
Čurma was nominated for nine fixtures before he made his Fortuna Liga debut for Ružomberok against Železiarne Podbrezová on 19 May 2017. He was replaced by Andrej Lovás after 80 minutes of the match at a goal-less score. Ružomberok went on to win, following a goal by Erik Daniel before the end of the match.

Honours
Spartak Trnava
Slovak Cup: 2021–22

References

External links
 MFK Ružomberok official profile
 Futbalnet profile
 
 Ligy.sk profile

1996 births
Living people
People from Zvolen District
Sportspeople from the Banská Bystrica Region
Slovak footballers
Association football defenders
MFK Ružomberok players
MFK Tatran Liptovský Mikuláš players
MFK Lokomotíva Zvolen players
Slovak Super Liga players
2. Liga (Slovakia) players